Tiangong University, formerly Tianjin Polytechnic University, is a municipal public university in Tianjin, China. The university is now sponsored by Tianjin Municipal People's Government.    

The university was first established in 1958 as Hebei Textile Institute. After several reorganizations, the university finally renamed to its current Chinese name in 2000. The English name used by the university from 2000 to 2019 was Tianjin Polytechnic University, despite the consistency of its Chinese name.  

The university currently has fourteen colleges and two campuses in Tianjin. The traditional campus is located in Hedong District, and the new campus is located in Xiqing District. The university is listed as a first-class discipline construction university by the Ministry of Education of China.

General information

Tiangong University (TGU) is a state-run full-time institution of higher education, which is jointly established by the Ministry of Education and the Tianjin Municipal Government. In 2003, TGU received outstanding marks in the “Undergraduate Program Evaluation” sponsored by Ministry of Education. The 460-acre new campus has been completed in the scenic spot of Xiqing District since 2006.

The university has a long history, with its earliest departments established in 1912. TGU is a multidisciplinary teaching and researching university, which offers undergraduate and postgraduate degrees in science and engineering, arts, liberal arts, management, economics，law, and languages. The university consists of 16 schools, offering bachelor, master, and doctor degrees in 60 undergraduate programs, 78 master's degree programs, and 16 doctoral degree programs. The university also holds 3 postdoctoral research stations. Now more than 28,000 full-time students study here, of which almost 3000 postgraduates.

Currently, there are 1,600 full-time teachers and more than 800 administrative staff in TGU, of whom more than 800 are professors and associate professors. TGU has also specially engaged over 20 academicians from the Chinese Academy of Sciences, the Chinese Academy of Engineering, and renowned foreign scholars as visiting scholars and part-time professors.

TGU is the frontrunner in China in the scientific research on textile composite materials, hollow fiber membrane separating technology, special functional fiber materials, textile oiling agent, semiconductor lighting, and production of electromechanical equipment integration, etc. The subject of textile engineering always ranks Top 2 in China. The university has over 60 research institutions in cooperation with some famous enterprises, including Motian Membrane Science and Technology Company, Functional Fiber Development Centre, etc.

TGU has more than 80 partner universities in more than 30 countries. Now there are about 1700 overseas students one year studying Chinese language, Textiles, Fashion design, Computer, Accounting, Art design, and so forth in TGU.

TGU is now taking great initiative in meeting the needs of the educational development in the 21st century and the economic construction in China and has become one of China's best universities in science and technology.

Schools and Faculties
 School of International Education
 School of Textiles Science and Engineering
 School of Electrical Engineering and Automation
 School of Environmental and Chemical Engineering
 School of Electronics and Information Engineering
 School of Materials Science and Engineering
 School of Computer science and Technology
 School of Economics
 School of Mechanical Engineering
 School of Arts
 School of Management
 School of Graduate
 School of Science
 School of Laws
 School of Humanities
 school of Life Sciences

References

Universities and colleges in Tianjin
Educational institutions established in 1912
1912 establishments in China